Tigisis can refer to

 Tigisis in Mauretania, an ancient town and modern titular see
 Tigisis in Numidia, an ancient town and modern titular see